Riot police are police who are organized, deployed, trained or equipped to confront crowds, protests or riots.

Riot police may be regular police who act in the role of riot police in particular situations or they may be separate units organized within or in parallel to regular police forces. Riot police are used in a variety of different situations and for a variety of different purposes. They may be employed to control riots as their name suggests, to disperse or control crowds, to maintain public order or discourage criminality, or to protect people or property.

Riot gear

Riot police often use special equipment termed riot gear to help protect themselves and attack others, oftentimes simultaneously. Riot gear typically includes personal armor, batons, riot shields, and riot helmets. Many riot police teams also deploy specialized less-than-lethal weapons, such as pepper spray, tear gas, riot guns, rubber bullets, stun grenades, water cannons, and Long Range Acoustic Devices.

List of riot police organizations

Albania – Rapid Intervention Force (Albania)
Algeria – Republican security units
 Argentina – Policía Federal Argentina D.O.U.C.A.D/ Infantry Guard Corp Gendarmeria Nacional Argentina Prefectura Naval Argentina
 Australia – Public Order and Riot Squad (New South Wales); Public Order Response Team (Victoria)
 Austria – Bereitschaftseinheit Wien of the Federal Police
 Azerbaijan – Azərbaycan Respublikası Daxili Qoşunları (Interior Troops)
 Belarus – OMON, Internal Troops of Belarus
 Belgium – Directie Openbare Veiligheid (DAS)/Direction Securité Public (DAS) (since 2016) 
 Brazil – Rondas Ostensivas Tobias de Aguiar
 Bulgaria – National Gendarmerie Service
 Canada – Emergency Response Teams, federal police tactical units of the Royal Canadian Mounted Police based throughout Canada
 Chile – Unidad de Fuerzas Especiales
 Colombia – ESMAD (since 1999)
 Czech Republic – Public Order Units
 France – Compagnies Républicaines de Sécurité (CRS) and Gendarmerie Mobile
 Germany – Bereitschaftspolizei units of the 16 Landespolizei (state police) forces and the Bundespolizei (federal police) 
 Georgia -  Special Tasks Department with Failities Protection Department (Mostly Conscripts) 
 Greece – Units for the Reinstatement of Order
 Hong Kong – Police Tactical Unit and Special Tactical Squad
 Hungary – 
 Indonesia – Mobile Brigade Corps (Brimob)
 India – Rapid Action Force
 Iran -Basij Iranian Public Security and Intelligence Police,Iranian Police Special Units,Counter-terrorism Special Force، women special division
 Ireland – Garda Public Order Unit
 Israel – Yasam
 Italy – Reparto Mobile  Polizia di Stato; Carabinieri (1st and 2nd Carabinieri Mobile Brigades, Multinational Specialized Unit)
 Japan – Riot Police Unit
 Kenya – General Service Unit
 Kyrgyzstan – Internal Troops of the Ministry of the Interior
 Latvia – Special Tasks Battalion of State Police (Latvia) (Speciālo Uzdevumu Bataljons)
 Lithuania – Public Security Service (VST)
 Malaysia – Federal Reserve Unit
the Republic of Moldova - Trupele de Carabinieri (Moldovan Carabinier Troops), since 1991
 Mongolia – Internal Troops
 Myanmar – Lon Htein
 Netherlands – Mobiele Eenheid (since 1936), Bijstandseenheid
 Pakistan –  Anti-Riot Force, Lahore, Punjab     (since 2016)
 Philippines - Special Action Force, Mobile Force Battalions/Companies
 Poland – ZOMO (1956  1989), Oddziały Prewencji Policji (OPP), Samodzielne Pododdziały Prewencji Policji (SPPP)
 Portugal – Corpo de Intervenção | Unidade Especial de Polícia | Polícia de Segurança Pública and Grupo de Intervenção e  Ordem Publica/  Guarda Nacional Republicana 
 Romania – Trupele de Securitate (1948  1989), Romanian Gendarmerie (1893  1948 and again since 1990)
 Russia – OMON, National Guard of Russia
 Serbia – Gendarmerie, Policijska Brigada, in extremely tough situations special forces units may be called, such as the Special Anti-Terrorist Unit
 Spain – Unidad de Intervención Policial (UIP), Unidad de Prevención y Reacción (UPR), Grupos de Reserva y Seguridad (GRS),
 Singapore – Police Tactical Unit (Singapore)
 Slovenia – PPE SWAT Riot Unit
 South Africa – Public Order Police
 Seychelles – Public Security Support Wing (PSSW)
 South Korea – Combat Police, division of National Police Agency
 Sweden - SPT Särskild polistaktik
 Taiwan – Special Police, NPASOG
 Tajikistan – Tajik Internal Troops
 Texas (USA) – Texas Ranger Division
 Thailand – Protection and Crowds Control Division
 Turkey – Çevik Kuvvet
 Turkmenistan – Türkmenistanyň içeri işler edaralarynyň işgärlerine (Internal Troops)
 Ukraine – Berkut (1992  2014), Patrol Police (since 2015)
 United Kingdom – Territorial Support Group (Metropolitan Police area)
 Uzbekistan – Internal Troops of the Ministry of Internal Affairs
 Venezuela – Bolivarian National Guard and Bolivarian National Police
 Vietnam – Mobile Police Command

See also
 Crowd control
 Internal Troops
 List of riots
 Mobile Field Force
 Police riot
 Riot control
 SWAT

References

Riot control
Law enforcement units